Gamayun is a prophetic bird of Russian folklore. It is a symbol of wisdom and knowledge and lives on an island in the mythical east, close to paradise. She is said to spread divine messages and prophecies, as she knows everything of all creation, gods, heroes, and man. Like the Sirin and the Alkonost, other creatures likewise deriving ultimately from the Greek myths and siren mythology, the Gamayun is normally depicted as a large bird with a woman's head. In the books of the 17th-19th centuries, Gamayun was described as a legless and wingless bird, ever-flying with the help of a tail, foreshadowing the death of statesmen by her fall.

Popular culture
In his esoteric cosmography Roza Mira (1997), Daniil Andreev maintains that Sirins, Alkonosts, and Gamayuns are transformed into Archangels in Paradise.

In season one, episode 10 the Netflix original television series The Crown, the Duke of Windsor speaks on the phone with his niece Elizabeth II, and likens the personhood of a monarch to a Sphinx or a Gamayun in that both creatures are fusions of two beings, never succeeding in being either.

Katherine Arden's second book from the Winternight trilogy mentions a Gamayun.

Gamayun Tales is a comic book series created by Alexander Utkin for Nobrow Press, in which Gamayun serves as the narrator for adaptations of Slavic legends and folklore.

References

Further reading
 
 

 
 

Legendary birds
Russian mythology
Human-headed mythical creatures
Female legendary creatures
Slavic legendary creatures
Avian humanoids